Tooronga railway station is located on the Glen Waverley line in Victoria, Australia. It serves the eastern Melbourne suburb of Malvern, and opened on 24 March 1890.

History
Tooronga station opened on 24 March 1890, when the railway line from Burnley was extended to East Malvern. The station is named after nearby Tooronga Road, which in turn was named after an adjacent two-story property. The word Tooronga is Indigenous, meaning "modern" or "new".

In 1955, the current station platforms were provided, when duplication of the line occurred between Kooyong and Gardiner. In 1975, the current station buildings were provided.

In 1966, boom barriers replaced interlocked gates at the Tooronga Road level crossing, located at the down end of the station. The signal box and a goods yard were also removed during that time.

Platforms and services
Tooronga has two side platforms. It is served by Glen Waverley line trains.

Platform 1:
  all stations and limited express services to Flinders Street

Platform 2:
  all stations services to Glen Waverley

Transport links
CDC Melbourne operates one bus route via Tooronga station, under contract to Public Transport Victoria:
 : Kew – Oakleigh station

The bus stops outside the station are also used by bus replacement services for Glen Waverley line trains.

Gallery

References

External links
 Melway map at street-directory.com.au

Railway stations in Melbourne
Railway stations in Australia opened in 1890
Railway stations in the City of Stonnington